National World is a British multimedia company. The company was founded as JPIMedia Publishing Ltd in November 2018 following the acquisition of Johnston Press assets by its creditors. JPIMedia was purchased by National World PLC for £10.2 million in January 2021. In April 2022, JPIMedia was rebranded to National World.

Its flagship titles include The Scotsman, the Yorkshire Post, the Falkirk Herald and Belfast's The News Letter. The company operates around 200 newspapers and websites around the United Kingdom.

Formation
On 17 November 2018, a spokesperson for Johnston Press announced that all its titles had been transferred to the control of JPIMedia, a special purpose vehicle (SPV), owned by the creditors. Under the terms of the pre-packaged deal, ownership passed to a consortium of four lenders – CarVal, Fidelity, Benefit Street Partners and Goldentree Asset Management – who reduced its debts to £85 million and injected £35 million investment. This however was subject to criticism by Johnston Press's largest shareholder, described as a "blatant pre-planned corporate theft by bondholders", and was raised in Parliament.

2019 asset sales
A syndicate of bondholders led by GoldenTree Asset Management reportedly hired bankers at Stella EOC in May 2019 to establish the basis for a prospective sale of all or a portion of the company.

In July 2019, it was confirmed that a sale process of JPIMedia was taking place.

Reach plc were said to be "early stages" of talks to buy "certain assets" from JPI Media. In November 2019, it was announced that the i had been sold to Daily Mail and General Trust.

In February 2020, it was announced that JPIMedia are no longer exploring a sale of their assets excluding the sale of the i which is subject to regulatory approval.

Sale to National World PLC
On 31 December 2020, it was announced that JPIMedia Publishing Ltd and its subsidiaries was being sold to National World PLC on 2 January 2021. The new company was set up by the media executive David Montgomery.

Rebranding of JPIMedia to National World
On 29 April 2022, JPIMedia Publishing Ltd rebranded to National World Publishing Ltd, otherwise known as National World.

Operations

Since the acquisition of National World Publishing Ltd, National World Plc has expanded its footprint into all the major metropolitan centres in the UK. 

In March 2021, nationalworld.com was launched as new national online news website, also known as NationalWorld. This was followed by the launch of several websites in Manchester, Liverpool, Newcastle, Glasgow, London, Birmingham and Bristol.

Newspapers in Great Britain
The following is a partial list of British newspapers owned by the company:

Arbroath Herald
Banbury Guardian
Batley & Birstall News
Bellshill Speaker
Berwick Advertiser
Biggleswade Chronicle
BirminghamWorld
Blackpool Gazette
Bognor Regis Observer
The Brechiner
BristolWorld
Bridlington Free Press
Brighton & Hove Independent
Buckingham Advertiser
Bucks Herald
Burnley Express
Buxton Advertiser
Carrick Gazette
Chichester Observer
Chorley Guardian
Crawley Observer
Cumbernauld News
Daventry Express
Derbyshire Times
Dewsbury Reporter
Diss Express
Dinnington Guardian
Doncaster Free Press
Edinburgh Evening News
Edinburgh Herald and Post
Eastbourne Herald
East Grinstead Gazette
Ellon Times
Farming Life
Falkirk Herald
Fife Free Press
Fife Herald & Post
Fife Leader
Filey Mercury
Fleetwood Weekly News
Forfar Dispatch
Galloway Gazette
Gainsborough Standard
Glasgow South and Eastwood Extra
GlasgowWorld
Green Un (Sheffield)
Halifax Courier
Hastings Observer
Harborough Mail
Hartlepool Mail
Harrogate Advertiser
Hemel Hempstead Gazette
Hemsworth and South Elmsall Express
Horncastle News
Kilsyth Chronicle
Kirriemuir Herald
Lanark Gazette
Lancashire Evening Post
Lancaster Guardian
Lancaster Visitor
Lancing Herald
Leyland Guardian
Leamington Courier
Leighton Buzzard Observer
Littlehampton Gazette
LiverpoolWorld
LondonWorld
Louth Leader
Luton News
Lytham St Annes Express
Market Rasen Mail
Malton & Pickering Mercury
ManchesterWorld
Mansfield Chad
Mid Sussex Times
Mirfield Reporter
Milngavie and Bearsden Herald
Milton Keynes Citizen
Montrose Review
Morecambe Visitor
Morpeth Herald
Motherwell Times
NewcastleWorld
News Guardian
News Post Leader
The News (Portsmouth)
Northamptonshire Evening Telegraph
Northampton Chronicle & Echo
Northumberland Gazette
NottinghamWorld
Paisley and Renfrewshire Extra (now defunct)
Perth Herald & Post
Peterborough Evening Telegraph
Pocklington Post
Retford Guardian
Ripon Gazette
Rugby Advertiser
Scarborough News
Scotland on Sunday
The Scotsman
Sheffield Star
Sheffield Telegraph
Shields Gazette
Shoreham Herald
Skegness Standard
Southern Reporter
Spilsby Standard
Stornoway Gazette
Sunderland Echo
Sussex Express
Times & Citizen (Bedford)
Todmorden News
 The Visitor (Morecambe, Lancs)
Westend Extra (Glasgow)
West Lothian Herald & Post
West Sussex County Times
West Sussex Gazette
Wetherby News
Whitby Gazette
Wigan Evening Post
Worksop Guardian
Worthing Herald
Yorkshire Evening Post
Yorkshire Post

Newspapers in Northern Ireland
National World Publishing Ltd publishes a total of 22 titles in Northern Ireland through two holding companies, JPIMedia NI and Derry Journal Newspapers. The geographic readership of some titles extends across the Irish border into the Republic of Ireland, such as the  Derry Journal which also covers County Donegal. Former JPIMedia titles published in the Republic of Ireland now belong to Iconic Newspapers.

Johnston Publishing (NI)

Daily
 The News Letter

Local (NI)
 Ballymena Times
 Ballymoney and Moyle Times
 Carrick Times (Carrickfergus)
 Coleraine Times
 Dromore Leader
 Larne Times
 Londonderry Sentinel
 Lurgan Mail
 Mid Ulster Mail
 Portadown Times
 Newtownabbey Times
 Tyrone Times
 Ulster Star
 The Newry Reporter

Free titles (NI)
 Banbridge & District Weekender
 Belfast News
 Craigavon Echo
 East Antrim Advertiser
 Lisburn Echo
 Mid Ulster Echo
 North West Echo

Derry Journal newspapers

Local (Derry Journal)
 Derry Journal
 Sunday Journal

Free titles (Derry Journal)
 City News
 Foyle News

Online websites
The company owns the following websites, in addition to newspaper sites as above, and regionalised versions of these:
Connect Local
Jobs Today
PeopleWorld
3 Added Minutes

References

2018 establishments in England
2021 mergers and acquisitions
British companies established in 2018
Johnston Press
Mass media companies established in 2018
Newspaper companies of the United Kingdom